SS Atlantic was a transatlantic ocean liner of the White Star Line that operated between Liverpool, United Kingdom, and New York City, United States. During the ship's 19th voyage, on 1 April 1873, she struck rocks and sank off the coast of Nova Scotia, Canada, killing at least 535 people.

History
Atlantic was built by Harland and Wolff in Belfast in 1870, as one of the four  liners. She was the second ship of the class. The four liners were built for the newly created Oceanic Steam Navigation Company, commonly referred to as the White Star Line. The engines were made by George Forrester and Company at the Vauxhall foundry, Liverpool. To communicate from the bridge to the engine room she was fitted with a telegraph.

For auxiliary propulsion she was rigged as a four-masted barque. She had three decks and five bulkheads extending from keelson to maindeck.

The four sister ships were luxurious with a standard unseen on any previous vessel. Two classes of accommodation were available. The staterooms were forward of the saloon with provision for four berth en suite accommodation as well as double cabins. The lavatories were provided with running water and the bathrooms had water heated by steam when required. Cabin class passengers were free to come on deck. There was also provision for 1,000 steerage passengers. Single males were housed forward of the cabin class area, aft of cabin class was reserved for single females and married couples. Steerage class passengers did not have access to the decks.

She sailed for New York City on her maiden voyage on 8 June 1871.  For her return trip (starting on 1 July 1871) she was advertised for all classes as being "unrivalled in safety, speed and comfort". She carried "surgeons and stewardesses".  Atlantic completed 18 crossings with no problems other than a minor incident on August 23rd, 1871 when she was hit by SS Alexandria.

Disaster

On 20 March 1873, Atlantic departed on her 19th voyage from Liverpool with 952 people on board, of whom 835 were passengers, and 14 stowaways. En route, because of heavy seas and strong headwinds slowing their progress, the captain, James Williams, became concerned that they would run out of coal for the boilers before reaching New York. They in fact had more than enough remaining fuel, but the ship's engineer had been purposefully under-reporting coal reserves to increase the margin for error in favor of safety. Thus convinced they were short of coal—and unable to hoist sail as a backup because of the strong headwind—the captain decided to divert to Halifax, Nova Scotia, to refuel.

Because almost none of the crew had ever been to Halifax before, they were unaware of the dangers of the approach; no one took soundings, posted a masthead lookout, reduced speed, or woke the captain as they approached the unfamiliar coast. They did not spot the Sambro Lighthouse, the large landfall lighthouse which warns mariners of the rocky shoals to the west of the harbour entrance. As the night wore on without any sight of the lighthouse, the helmsman—the only crew member familiar with Halifax—became convinced that something was wrong, and relayed his concerns to the officers on duty, but was ultimately ignored.

At 3:15 a.m. local time on 1 April 1873, Atlantic struck an underwater rock ("Golden Rule Rock") off Marr's Head, Meagher's Island (now Mars Head, Mars Island), Nova Scotia. All 10 lifeboats were lowered by the crew but were all washed away or smashed as the ship quickly filled with water and partially capsized. Survivors were forced to swim or climb ropes first to a wave-swept rock and then to a barren shore. Residents of the tiny fishing village of Lower Prospect and Terence Bay soon arrived to rescue and shelter the survivors, but at least 535 people died, leaving only 429 survivors. The ship's manifest indicates that of the 952 aboard, 156 were women and 189 were children (including two who had been born during the voyage). All women and children perished except for one twelve-year-old boy, John Hindley. Ten crew members were lost, while 131 survived. The Canadian government inquiry concluded with the statement, "the conduct of Captain Williams in the management of his ship during the twelve or fourteen hours preceding the disaster, was so gravely at variance with what ought to have been the conduct of a man placed in his responsible position."

Recovery of the dead

Recovery and burial of the large numbers of victims took weeks. Divers were paid rewards for recovering the many bodies trapped within the hull. According to one newspaper account, a body of one of the crew members was discovered to be that of a woman disguised as a man. "She was about twenty or twenty-five years old and had served as a common sailor for three voyages, and her sex was never known until the body was washed ashore and prepared for burial. She is described as having been a great favorite with all her shipmates, and one of the crew, speaking of her, remarked: "I didn't know Bill was a woman. He used to take his grog as regular as any of us, and was always begging or stealing tobacco. He was a good fellow, though, and I am sorry he was a woman."

Legacy

Atlantic was the second liner commissioned by White Star Line ( being first) but carried the notoriety of being the first White Star steamer to sink (the company had previously lost the clipper  in Dublin Bay in 1854).

Today, most of the ship lies heavily fragmented under  of water. Artifacts recovered from several salvage operations are on display at the Maritime Museum of the Atlantic in Halifax, Nova Scotia and also at the SS Atlantic Heritage Park and Interpretation Centre, in Terence Bay, Nova Scotia. A monument to the wreck, donated by ship owner Thomas Henry Ismay's family, is located at the mass grave near the interpretation centre in the Terence Bay Anglican Cemetery, while a smaller monument marks a second mass grave at the Catholic cemetery.

The 1929 film Atlantic was originally named Titanic, made only seventeen years after the sinking of that ship. After lawsuits from the White Star Line, the movie was released under the title Atlantic, although the film is unrelated to the earlier White Star Line disaster.

P. G. Wodehouse wrote a story in 1921 called The Girl On The Boat in which six chapters of the romance take place on a White Star liner named Atlantic, crossing from New York to Southampton. As the real Atlantic disaster had occurred forty-eight years before the story and eight years before he was born, it is unlikely that he knew about it.

References and sources

 Reprint of April 1873 newspaper coverage of the disaster
 On the Rocks: Shipwrecks of Nova Scotia - Maritime Museum of the Atlantic, Halifax, Nova Scotia
 S.S. Atlantic Memorial, Sandy Cove

External links

 Carte-de-visite photograph of unidentified boy (possibly RMS Atlantic survivor John Hindley?} Another picture of Hindley can be found on website MaritimeQuest - Atlantic (1871)) {Note: this second website is copyrighted and is here for reference only}, and at http://central.bac-lac.gc.ca/.redirect?app=fonandcol&id=3257309&lang=eng
Photographs of the SS Atlantic Memorial at Terence Bay, Nova Scotia
Photographs of the SS Atlantic Memorial at Lower Prospect, Nova Scotia
Website of the SS Atlantic Heritage Park and Interpretation Center in Terence Bay, Nova Scotia
Passenger list
HalifaxTrails.ca

 

Steamships of the United Kingdom
Shipwrecks of the Nova Scotia coast
History of Halifax, Nova Scotia
Maritime incidents in April 1873
Ships of the White Star Line
Ships built in Belfast
1870 ships
Ships built by Harland and Wolff